Yago Balthazar Bernardi Gutierrez (born 10 August 2001) is an Argentine footballer currently playing as a center-back for Akritas Chlorakas, on loan from Boca Juniors.

Career statistics

Club

Notes

References

2001 births
Living people
Footballers from Buenos Aires
Argentine footballers
Spanish footballers
Association football defenders
Argentine Primera División players
Boca Juniors footballers
Akritas Chlorakas players
Argentine expatriate footballers
Argentine expatriate sportspeople in Cyprus
Expatriate footballers in Cyprus